Sumner Ely (May 22, 1787 in Lyme, New London County, Connecticut – February 3, 1857) was an American physician and politician from New York.

Life
He was the son of Adriel Ely and Sarah (Stowe) Ely. He graduated from Yale College in 1804. Then he studied medicine with Dr. Thomas Broadhead at Clermont, New York, and was licensed to practice in 1809. In 1810, he removed to Middlefield, New York, and practiced medicine there. On June 11, 1816, he married Hannah Knapp Gilbert (1791–1868), and they had five sons, among them Assemblyman William H. Ely (b. 1829).

Sumner Ely was Postmaster of Middlefield and a brigadier general of the New York State Militia.

He was a member of the New York State Assembly (Otsego Co.) in 1836.

He was a Democratic member of the New York State Senate (5th D.) from 1840 to 1843, sitting in the 63rd, 64th, 65th and 66th New York State Legislatures.

Sources
The New York Civil List compiled by Franklin Benjamin Hough (pages 132ff, 140, 218 and 272; Weed, Parsons and Co., 1858)
Table of the Post Offices in the United States (1836; pg. 97)
The New York Annual Register for the Year of 1831 (pg. 287)
Biographical Sketch of the late Sumner Ely M.D. in Transactions of the Medical Society of the State of New York (Albany, 1858; pg. 23–34)

1787 births
1857 deaths
Democratic Party New York (state) state senators
People from Middlefield, New York
Democratic Party members of the New York State Assembly
New York (state) postmasters
Physicians from New York (state)
Yale College alumni
People from Lyme, Connecticut
People from Columbia County, New York
19th-century American politicians